Linda Hayden may refer to:

 Linda Hayden (actress) (born 1953), English film and television actress
 Linda B. Hayden (born 1949), American mathematician